Luka Juričić (born 25 November 1983) is a Croatian actor, director and author. Juričić debuted alongside fellow Pula actress Jadranka Đokić in Šverceri hlapić (1999) which he also directed. His television roles include Blagoje in Zauvijek susjedi (2008), and Srećko in Dome, slatki dome (2010). Juričić also starred in some films, including Will Not End Here (2008). He is the author of the Croatian TV series Dar mar, which debuted on Nova TV in 2020. Juričić is best known for his theater work. He has starred in such productions as Dok nas smrt ne rastavi  and the award-winning Neboder ("Skyscraper").

Early life
Juričić was born in Pula on 25 November 1983. He attended Italian language school, graduating from the Dante Alighieri High School. Juričić stated that he got the passion for acting when he was in elementary school. In elementary school he started to take drama classes. In early 1997 he started drama school at the Istrian National Theater, in his native Pula. He participated in theater projects from 1997 until 2002, when he enrolled at the Academy of Dramatic Arts in Zagreb, graduating in 2008.

Career

Theater
Juričić started his acting career with such roles as Otavijo in Štoria ud Otavia i Nikolete, Bepo in Daniel Načinović's Divojke za ženidbu (INK, Pula), and Francis Flute in A Midsummer Night's Dream (HNK Zagreb). He went on to star as the title character in Ballads of Petrica Kerempuh (Gavella), the lead character in Zaljubljenici (INK/FERR), the Priest, mother-in-law, neighbor, sister in Dok nas smrt ne rastavi (Kerempuh), for which he was praised by Matica hrvatska, as Caki in Multicro (HNK Osijek), and as Ante in Miro Gavran's Parellel Worlds (HNK Osijek). In 2009 he was one of the lead characters in the award-winning Neboder ("Skyscraper").

In 2021 a play starring Juričić, Moje istrijansko korona vjenčanje, debuted in Pula. Juričić played several roles in the play, and is also the author of the scenography. The production was well received and his performance was described as "extraordinary". In the 2000s he was one of the several Croatian stars who performed at the recently opened Moruzgva Theater. He was one of the main characters (Florian) of Floromanija, which premiered at the Požega City Theater in 2017. 

Children's theater
Juričić was the lead character of Ivica Šimić's children's play Rock'n'roll za DVA MIŠA, which debuted in Zagreb in 2008. He is one of the lead characters (playing Zlatko) of Snježana Banović's adaptation of Debela. He starred in the Mala Scena Theater production since its conception in 2008 for over ten years. Juričić stars in the play alongside , who suggested the show to him.
Beside being an actor, Juričić is the director of Pula's children's theater Teatar Naranča ("Orange Theater"). He has stated that he manages to "balance the obligations of the stage and the Orange Theater" thanks to good organization and quality staff.

Television
In 2007 Juričić had a part in an episode of Luda kuća. In 2008 he played Blagoje in the Croatian TV series Zauvijek susjedi (2008). He had small parts in Dobre namjere (2008), Bitange i princeze and Odmori se, zaslužio si (2009). In 2010 he played Srećko in Dome, slatki dome (18 March 2010 - 22 July 2010). He played young Đuka Lotar in an episode of Najbolje godine (2011) and made a cameo in Stipe u gostima (2011). In 2020 he authored the TV series Dar mar, which debuted on Nova TV in 2020. 

Film
Juričić's first film role was in the 1999 movie Šverceri hlapić, alongside Jadranka Đokić, who debuted in that movie too. Juričić was also the director of the movie. He later starred in Čejen Černić's short film Pratioci alongside Urša Raukar-Gamulin and Luka Petrušić. He had a small part in Will Not End Here'' (2008).

Awards and honours

Personal life

Filmography

Stage

Film roles

Television roles

Voice-over roles

References

External links

1983 births
Living people
21st-century Croatian actors
20th-century Croatian actors
21st-century Croatian writers
20th-century Croatian writers
Croatian stage actors
Croatian television actors
Croatian film actors
People from Pula
Shakespearean actors
Academy of Dramatic Art, University of Zagreb alumni